A constitutional referendum was held in Chad on 10 December 1989. The new constitution made the country a one-party state with the National Union for Independence and Revolution as the sole legal party, as well as confirming Hissène Habré, who had come to power in a 1982 coup, as president. It also provided for a presidential republic with a unicameral National Assembly. It was passed by 99.9% of voters, with a turnout of 93%.

Results

References

Chad
Constitutional referendum
Referendums in Chad
Constitutional referendums
Chadian constitutional referendum